Robert Vernon Atherton Gwillym  (c.1741–1783) was a British country landowner and politician who sat in the House of Commons from 1774 to 1780.

 
Gwillym was the second son  of Robert Gwillym of Langstone, Herefordshire and his wife Elizabeth Atherton (1721-1763), daughter of Richard Atherton (1700-1726) and Elizabeth Farrington of Atherton Hall. He is a direct descendant of Richard Atherton.

He married Henrietta Maria Legh, daughter  of  Peter Legh (1706–1792]  of Lyme Park and Bank Hall in January 1763.

In 1766 at the age of 25, both he and his family were painted by Joseph Wright of Derby

He succeeded his brother William in 1771, and inherited Atherton Hall, Leigh. That same year he is listed as a subscriber to a journal on travels to America and of agriculture and plantations. It is likely that he invested in such enterprises, as did the other members of the Atherton family.
    
At the 1774 general election, Gwillym was returned unopposed as Member of Parliament for  Newton on the interest of his father-in-law. His attendance in Parliament was very infrequent as he suffered from poor health.  His only recorded vote was for Wilkes's Middlesex resolution, and he is not recorded as having spoken. He did not stand at the 1780 general election.

Gwillym took name of Atherton in 1779. He and his wife Henrietta had two sons who died young and four daughters. His daughter Henrietta Maria Atherton married Thomas Powys, 2nd Baron Lilford on 5 December 1797 at Penwortham, Lancashire and they had twelve children. He died in France on 9 July 1783.

The family portraits were inherited by his eldest daughter, Henrietta Maria Vernon Atherton, the wife of Thomas Powys, 2nd Baron Lilford and remained under the ownership of the Lilford family until 1961.

Descendants

 Thomas Powys, 3rd Baron Lilford
 Thomas Powys, 4th Baron Lilford
 John Powys, 5th Baron Lilford
 Stephen Powys, 6th Baron Lilford
 George Powys, 7th Baron Lilford
 Mark Powys, 8th Baron Lilford

References

1740s births
1783 deaths
Members of the Parliament of Great Britain for English constituencies
British MPs 1774–1780